The 1933–34 New York Rangers season was the franchise's eighth season. In the regular season, the Rangers finished third in the American Division with a 21–19–8 record. New York qualified for the Stanley Cup playoffs, where they lost to the Montreal Maroons 2–1 in a two-game, total goals series.

Regular season

Final standings

Record vs. opponents

Schedule and results

|- align="center" bgcolor="#FFBBBB"
| 1 || 11 || @ Toronto Maple Leafs || 4–3 || 0–1–0
|- align="center" bgcolor="#FFBBBB"
| 2 || 12 || @ Chicago Black Hawks || 1–0 || 0–2–0
|- align="center" bgcolor="#CCFFCC"
| 3 || 16 || Detroit Red Wings || 2–1 || 1–2–0
|- align="center" bgcolor="#FFBBBB"
| 4 || 19 || @ Detroit Red Wings || 4–1 || 1–3–0
|- align="center" bgcolor="white"
| 5 || 21 || Toronto Maple Leafs || 1 – 1 OT || 1–3–1
|- align="center" bgcolor="#FFBBBB"
| 6 || 25 || @ Montreal Maroons || 1–0 || 1–4–1
|-

|- align="center" bgcolor="#CCFFCC"
| 7 || 2 || @ Boston Bruins || 3–0 || 2–4–1
|- align="center" bgcolor="#CCFFCC"
| 8 || 3 || Chicago Black Hawks || 1 – 0 OT || 3–4–1
|- align="center" bgcolor="white"
| 9 || 7 || Montreal Canadiens || 0 – 0 OT || 3–4–2
|- align="center" bgcolor="#CCFFCC"
| 10 || 9 || @ Montreal Canadiens || 4–2 || 4–4–2
|- align="center" bgcolor="#FFBBBB"
| 11 || 12 || New York Americans || 3–0 || 4–5–2
|- align="center" bgcolor="#CCFFCC"
| 12 || 14 || @ Ottawa Senators || 4–3 || 5–5–2
|- align="center" bgcolor="white"
| 13 || 17 || Boston Bruins || 2 – 2 OT || 5–5–3
|- align="center" bgcolor="white"
| 14 || 21 || Ottawa Senators || 0 – 0 OT || 5–5–4
|- align="center" bgcolor="#CCFFCC"
| 15 || 24 || @ New York Americans || 3–1 || 6–5–4
|- align="center" bgcolor="#CCFFCC"
| 16 || 25 || Montreal Maroons || 3–0 || 7–5–4
|- align="center" bgcolor="white"
| 17 || 28 || Toronto Maple Leafs || 2 – 2 OT || 7–5–5
|- align="center" bgcolor="#FFBBBB"
| 18 || 31 || New York Americans || 3–1 || 7–6–5
|-

|- align="center" bgcolor="#CCFFCC"
| 19 || 2 || Montreal Canadiens || 3–2 || 8–6–5
|- align="center" bgcolor="#FFBBBB"
| 20 || 4 || @ Detroit Red Wings || 3–1 || 8–7–5
|- align="center" bgcolor="white"
| 21 || 7 || @ Chicago Black Hawks || 1 – 1 OT || 8–7–6
|- align="center" bgcolor="#CCFFCC"
| 22 || 9 || Detroit Red Wings || 2–1 || 9–7–6
|- align="center" bgcolor="#CCFFCC"
| 23 || 11 || @ Ottawa Senators || 5–3 || 10–7–6
|- align="center" bgcolor="#CCFFCC"
| 24 || 14 || Montreal Maroons || 3–1 || 11–7–6
|- align="center" bgcolor="#FFBBBB"
| 25 || 16 || @ New York Americans || 2–1 || 11–8–6
|- align="center" bgcolor="#CCFFCC"
| 26 || 18 || Chicago Black Hawks || 5–0 || 12–8–6
|- align="center" bgcolor="#FFBBBB"
| 27 || 20 || @ Montreal Canadiens || 5–4 || 12–9–6
|- align="center" bgcolor="#CCFFCC"
| 28 || 23 || Ottawa Senators || 5–2 || 13–9–6
|- align="center" bgcolor="#CCFFCC"
| 29 || 25 || @ Ottawa Senators || 6–3 || 14–9–6
|- align="center" bgcolor="#CCFFCC"
| 30 || 28 || Boston Bruins || 4–2 || 15–9–6
|- align="center" bgcolor="#FFBBBB"
| 31 || 30 || @ Boston Bruins || 2–1 || 15–10–6
|-

|- align="center" bgcolor="white"
| 32 || 1 || Toronto Maple Leafs || 5 – 5 OT || 15–10–7
|- align="center" bgcolor="#CCFFCC"
| 33 || 3 || @ Montreal Maroons || 4–2 || 16–10–7
|- align="center" bgcolor="#CCFFCC"
| 34 || 6 || Montreal Canadiens || 3–0 || 17–10–7
|- align="center" bgcolor="#FFBBBB"
| 35 || 11 || New York Americans || 4–3 || 17–11–7
|- align="center" bgcolor="#CCFFCC"
| 36 || 13 || @ Boston Bruins || 6–4 || 18–11–7
|- align="center" bgcolor="#FFBBBB"
| 37 || 15 || @ Montreal Canadiens || 5–2 || 18–12–7
|- align="center" bgcolor="#FFBBBB"
| 38 || 18 || Chicago Black Hawks || 2–1 || 18–13–7
|- align="center" bgcolor="#CCFFCC"
| 39 || 22 || Detroit Red Wings || 3–1 || 19–13–7
|- align="center" bgcolor="#FFBBBB"
| 40 || 24 || @ Toronto Maple Leafs || 8–3 || 19–14–7
|- align="center" bgcolor="#FFBBBB"
| 41 || 27 || @ Detroit Red Wings || 5–1 || 19–15–7
|-

|- align="center" bgcolor="#CCFFCC"
| 42 || 1 || @ Chicago Black Hawks || 3–1 || 20–15–7
|- align="center" bgcolor="#FFBBBB"
| 43 || 6 || Ottawa Senators || 5 – 4 OT || 20–16–7
|- align="center" bgcolor="white"
| 44 || 8 || @ Montreal Maroons || 2 – 2 OT || 20–16–8
|- align="center" bgcolor="#FFBBBB"
| 45 || 11 || Montreal Maroons || 7 – 3 OT || 20–17–8
|- align="center" bgcolor="#CCFFCC"
| 46 || 13 || @ New York Americans || 2–1 || 21–17–8
|- align="center" bgcolor="#FFBBBB"
| 47 || 15 || Boston Bruins || 3–2 || 21–18–8
|- align="center" bgcolor="#FFBBBB"
| 48 || 17 || @ Toronto Maple Leafs || 3–2 || 21–19–8
|-

Playoffs

Key:  Win  Loss

Player statistics
Skaters

Goaltenders

†Denotes player spent time with another team before joining Rangers. Stats reflect time with Rangers only.
‡Traded mid-season. Stats reflect time with Rangers only.

See also
1933–34 NHL season

References

 
New York Rangers
1933–34 New York Rangers Statistics

New York Rangers seasons
New York Rangers
New York Rangers
New York Rangers
New York Rangers
Madison Square Garden
1930s in Manhattan